Killen is a small village and townland (of 356 acres) in County Tyrone, Northern Ireland. It is several miles southwest of Castlederg, on the road leading south over Scraghy Mountain. A short distance to the west lies County Donegal, in the Republic of Ireland. It is situated in the civil parish of Longfield West and the historic barony of Omagh West. In the 2001 Census it had a population of 231 people.

In recent years, Killen Creamery has been turned into a community centre and business centre. Killen also has an Orange Lodge, which was founded in 1829.

References 

Villages in County Tyrone
Civil parish of Longfield West
Townlands of County Tyrone